Essinge IK is a Swedish football club located in Stockholm.

Background
Essinge Idrottsklubb is a sports club from Stockholm that was founded on 8 June 1919. Over the years the club has mainly been active in team sports such as football, bandy, handball and ice hockey at various levels in the Swedish league systems. The most successful section of the club has been the now defunct bandy team. The club currently only runs a football section.

Since their foundation Essinge IK has participated mainly in the middle and lower divisions of the Swedish football league system.  In 2002 Essinge IK merged with Vasalunds IF and formed a new team Vasalund/Essinge IF. The merger was discontinued before the 2008 season. Essinge IK continued to play, with a youth team, in the lowest Stockholm leagues during the merger under the name Essinge IK Fotboll. When the alliance with Vasalund was dissolved, Essinge IK once again changed back to their original name.

The club currently plays in Division 6 Stockholm C which is the eighth tier of Swedish football. They play their home matches at the Essinge IP which has been newly refurbished with artificial turf and has a new clubhouse. Their home venue is also used by Långholmen FC. Essinge IK have their own clubhouse at Essingeöarna on Stora Essingen.

Essinge IK are affiliated to the Stockholms Fotbollförbund. The club runs a football school for children from the age of six and a range of teams serving boys and girls. In addition there are women's and men's teams.  In total there are 300 active players within the club.

The ice hockey team played the 1959/1960 season in the Swedish second division.

Season to season – Men's

Since 1995 Essinge IK (under the names Essinge IK FK, Essinge International FC and Essinge IK Fotboll) have competed in the following divisions:

During the period 2003 to 2007 Essinge IK (under the name Vasalund/Essinge IF) merged with Vasalunds IF and competed in the following divisions:

Footnotes

Archive, accessdate: 13 December 2013

External links
 Essinge IK – Men's team 
  Essinge IK Facebook

 
Association football clubs established in 1919
Bandy clubs established in 1919
Defunct bandy clubs in Sweden
Football clubs in Stockholm
1919 establishments in Sweden